Juleen R. Zierath is an American-Swedish biologist. Her research focuses on the cellular mechanisms that correspond to the development of insulin resistance in Type II diabetes. Her other research areas look at exercise-mediated effects on skeletal muscle glucose metabolism and gene expression.

Early life and education
Zierath was born in Milwaukee, Wisconsin.  She earned her bachelor's degree in Secondary Education and Business Administration from the University of Wisconsin in 1984. Her master's degree in Exercise Physiology was earned from Ball State University in 1986. She then started a PhD in Physiology at Karolinska Institute and defended her thesis in 1995. Right afterwards she began a post-doc at Harvard Medical School.

Career
In 1998, Zierath accepted an Associate Professor position at Karolinska Institute in Physiology.

From 2002 - 2008, she was Chairman of the Steering Committee of the Karolinska Institute Metabolism and Endocrinology Network, Karolinska Institutet, Stockholm, Sweden.

In 2006, she became a Member of the Scientific Advisory Board, Keystone Organization/Symposium, and also joined the Nobel Assembly, Karolinska Institutet.

In 2010, she was named Professor of Integrative Physiology, Scientific Director, Integrative Physiology Section, Novo Nordisk Foundation Center for Basic Metabolic Research, University of Copenhagen

Zierath is a member of the Nobel Committee since 2011, after serving as an Adjunct member from 2008–10, and its chairman from 2013 to 2015. Other activities she is involved in include Director of the Strategic Research Program in Diabetes at Karolinska Institute, Editor-in-Chief of Diabetologia, Chair of the Board of Directors - Keystone Organization/Symposium and President of the European Association for the Study of Diabetes.

Works 
Zierath has published over 200 original research papers and review articles, and her work has been reported in scientific journals, including Nature (journal).  Her research provided the first evidence for physiological regulation of insulin signaling pathways and revealed key steps along this pathway are impaired in diabetic patients. Another study showed that exercise can change the way that genes are expressed in muscle cells.

References

External links

Google Scholar report

Living people
Scientists from Milwaukee
American physiologists
Ball State University alumni
Karolinska Institute alumni
Wisconsin School of Business alumni
1961 births
Women physiologists
American expatriates in Sweden
20th-century American scientists
20th-century American women scientists
21st-century American scientists
21st-century American women scientists
Minkowski Prize recipients